Abd Al-Rahman Al-Mahrami (: born 1980), known as Abu Zaraa'a Al-Mahrami, is a Yemeni Salafi leader who has served as a member of the Yemen's Presidential Leadership Council since 7 April 2022. He is the commander of the UAE-backed Southern Brigades.

References 

1980 births
Presidential Leadership Council
People from Abyan Governorate
Yemeni Salafis
Yemeni Islamists
Living people
21st-century Yemeni military personnel
People of the Yemeni Civil War (2014–present)